Isoetes caroliniana, common name Carolina quillwort, is a wetlands plant native to the mountains of Tennessee, North Carolina, Virginia and West Virginia. It is an emergent plant found in lakes and bogs. It is closely related to I. georgiana (the Georgia quillwort) but can be distinguished by its unpigmented sporangium wall.

Some sources regard it as a synonym of Isoetes valida, but others treat it as a full species.

References

External links
Photo of herbarium specimen at Missouri Botanical Garden, collected in North Carolina in 1893, type specimen for Isoëtes caroliniana/Isoëtes engelmannii var. caroliniana includes scanning electron microscope photos of male and female spores

caroliniana
Flora of the Southeastern United States
Plants described in 1900
Flora without expected TNC conservation status